David Douglas Garrard (born February 14, 1978) is an American former football quarterback who played in the National Football League (NFL) for 10 seasons, primarily with the Jacksonville Jaguars. He played college football at East Carolina and was selected by the Jaguars in the fourth round of the 2002 NFL Draft. Garrard became the team's starting quarterback in 2007, leading them to their first playoff win since 1999. A Pro Bowl selection in 2009, he remained the starter until he was released after the 2010 season.

Early life
Garrard was born in East Orange, New Jersey and grew up in Durham, North Carolina. When he was fourteen his mother died of breast cancer.  When he began his professional career he created The David Garrard Foundation to promote breast cancer awareness and research.

Garrard attended Southern High School in Durham, where he was named an All-America choice by Prep Stars and rated the best high school quarterback in North Carolina. Veteran high school coaches in North Carolina said Garrard possessed one of the strongest arms they had ever seen and compared Garrard to former NFL quarterback and North Carolina native Roman Gabriel.

College career
Garrard attended East Carolina University, where he played for the East Carolina Pirates football team.  Although physically larger than most quarterbacks at more than 240 pounds, Garrard displayed exceptional mobility. Former East Carolina head football coach Steve Logan compared the experience of tackling Garrard to "getting hit by a beer truck." Garrard also proved durable, starting every game for the Pirates in the 1999, 2000, and 2001 seasons.

In Garrard's sophomore season, he led the Pirates to a 9–3 record with victories over the West Virginia Mountaineers, South Carolina Gamecocks, Miami Hurricanes, and North Carolina State Wolfpack. In the fourth game of the season against Miami, East Carolina came back from a 20–3 deficit to defeat the 13th-ranked Miami Hurricanes, 27–23. Garrard threw a 27-yard touchdown pass to Keith Stokes for the go-ahead score in the final minutes of the game. ECU was unable to play the scheduled home game at Dowdy–Ficklen Stadium on its campus in Greenville, NC, because Hurricane Floyd had ravaged the eastern part of the state the prior week. The hurricane also prevented the Pirates from returning to Greenville following a road victory against South Carolina, leaving ECU's football team stranded in Columbia, SC. East Carolina moved the game against Miami to Carter–Finley Stadium in Raleigh.  The victory propelled ECU into the Associated Press college football poll's top 25. The Pirates spent eleven weeks ranked in the AP poll, climbed to as high as 16th in the poll, and finished the regular season ranked 20th.  East Carolina dropped out of the top 25 to 27th in the voting after losing 28–14 in the 1999 Mobile Alabama Bowl to Texas Christian University and the Horned Frogs' star running back, LaDainian Tomlinson.

ECU finished 8–4 in Garrard's junior season. Garrard capped the season by throwing an unbelievable touchdown and rushing for another acrobatic touchdown in a 40–27 victory against Texas Tech in the Galleryfurniture.com Bowl.  Garrard's senior season began with high expectations but ended in disappointment. Although East Carolina averaged more than 35 points per game in 2001, the Pirates finished the season with a 6–6 record.

Ironically, the final game of Garrard's college career pitted him against Marshall University and its starting quarterback, Byron Leftwich, in the 2001 GMAC Bowl. Garrard and Leftwich would eventually be teammates with the Jacksonville Jaguars and compete for the team's starting quarterback position. In the highest-scoring bowl game in college football history to that point, Leftwich brought Marshall back from a thirty-point deficit to defeat Garrard's East Carolina Pirates 64–61 in double-overtime.

Garrard broke 28 school passing and offensive records at East Carolina and joined a select few quarterbacks who achieved more than 9000 passing yards and 1000 rushing yards in their collegiate careers.

Garrard went on to graduate from East Carolina University in 2001 with a degree in Construction Management.

Statistics

Professional career

Jacksonville Jaguars

Garrard was drafted in the fourth round as the 108th overall pick in the 2002 draft by the Jacksonville Jaguars. Head coach Tom Coughlin saw him as the eventual successor to starting quarterback Mark Brunell. Coughlin however was fired following the 2002 season, and the team drafted quarterback Byron Leftwich with the seventh overall pick in the 2003 NFL Draft. Leftwich replaced an injured Brunell midway through the 2003 season, and Garrard continued to serve as the team's backup.

Garrard was diagnosed with Crohn's disease in January 2004, and underwent treatment. Despite having surgery to remove a nearly 12-inch portion of his intestines in June, Garrard was healthy to start the 2004 season. His only start of the season came in Week 9 against Detroit when Leftwich was injured; he threw two touchdowns to zero interceptions, with his second touchdown coming in overtime to win the game.

In week 12 of the 2005 season, Leftwich was injured on the first play of the game and ruled out the rest of the regular season. Garrard led the Jaguars on a 5–1 run through their final six games to secure a playoff berth. 
He threw for 1,117 yards, 4 touchdowns, 1 interception for an 83.9 quarterback rating, and his lone loss came against the then–undefeated Indianapolis Colts. Leftwich then returned as the starter for the AFC Wild Card game, in which the Jaguars suffered a 28–3 loss to the New England Patriots.

In 2006, Garrard was named the starter in Week 8 and replaced Leftwich for the remainder of the season. Through his first seven games as starter, Garrard led Jacksonville to a 5–2 record, leading to speculation that the Jaguars might seek to replace Leftwich permanently with Garrard. He lost his final three starts however, and the Jaguars missed the playoffs.

Entering the 2007 season, Jack Del Rio attempted to avoid a quarterback controversy by naming Leftwich the team's unconditional starting quarterback. However, Garrard outplayed Leftwich in the preseason, and Del Rio named him the starting quarterback on August 31, 2007. The Jaguars released Leftwich the next day.

In his first season as the team's starting quarterback, Garrard led the Jaguars to a 10–2 record and threw for 18 touchdowns and 2,509 yards in 12 games (he missed 3 games with a sprained ankle and sat out the season finale with the rest of their starters). He threw just three interceptions on the year, which gave him a quarterback rating of 102.2.

On January 5, 2008, In the AFC Wild Card, Garrard led his team to a 31–29 victory over the Pittsburgh Steelers. Down 29–28 with 1:56 to go, he led his team in a field goal-scoring drive highlighted by a 32-yard run on 4th and 2 that eventually set up the game-winning field goal for the Jaguars.

On January 12, 2008, In the AFC Divisional Round, Garrard set franchise records with 22 completions and 278 yards, along with 2 touchdowns and 1 interception against the unbeaten New England Patriots. However, the Patriots won the game, 31–20.

On April 7, 2008, it was announced that the Jaguars and Garrard had agreed to a contract extension, worth $60 million for 6 years.

Garrard played in all 16 games in both the 2008 and 2009 seasons, but the Jaguars only managed 5–11 and 7–9 records respectively. The team slumped behind multiple injuries to their offensive line, and new GM Gene Smith ushering in a "rebuilding era."

Garrard was named to the 2009 Pro Bowl, and finished the game with 183 yards and a touchdown in the AFC's win. He followed up his Pro Bowl appearance throwing for 23 touchdowns, 2,734 yards, a quarterback rating of 91 and an 8–6 record in 14 games in the 2010 season. In week 8, he completed 17 of 21 passes for 260 yards (a franchise record 12.4 average), four touchdowns, zero interceptions, a franchise record 157.8 rating, and rushed for a fifth score in a 35-17 win over the Cowboys.

Despite his Pro Bowl selection and a comeback year, Jacksonville drafted Missouri quarterback Blaine Gabbert with their first round draft pick. Though Del Rio insisted Garrard would remain the team's starting quarterback, he was released by Jacksonville on September 6, 2011, less than a week before the start of the regular season.

After his release from Jacksonville, Garrard received interest from the Colts, Dolphins and Raiders. He instead decided to use his time off to have surgery on his herniated disk and prepare himself for the 2012 season.

Miami Dolphins 
On March 19, 2012, Garrard agreed to terms with the Miami Dolphins on a one-year contract, and was assumed to be the team's starting quarterback for the year. On August 11, Garrard had arthroscopic knee surgery and was ruled out of all four preseason games. The Dolphins released Garrard on September 4, 2012.

New York Jets 
The New York Jets announced that they had signed a contract with Garrard on March 11, 2013. Garrard announced his intention to retire on May 15, 2013, as consistent knee swelling impaired his ability to play. The Jets placed Garrard on the reserve/retired list on May 30, 2013.

After resting his knee, Garrard decided to make a comeback and the Jets agreed to re-sign Garrard on October 10, 2013. He was placed on the exempt list for two weeks. He was activated on October 21, 2013.

Retirement 
On May 8, 2015, Garrard signed a contract with the Jacksonville Jaguars to officially retire as a member of the team.

NFL career statistics

Franchise records 
, David Garrard held multiple Jaguars franchise records, including:

 Passer rating: career (85.8), season (102.2 in 2007), game (157.8 on October 31, 2010 @DAL)
 Sacked: playoff season (5 in 2007; with Mark Brunell (1999) and Blake Bortles (2017)), playoff game (4 on January 5, 2008 @PIT)
 Yards per attempt: playoffs (7.84), playoff season (7.74 in 2007)

Personal life
Garrard proposed to his wife Mary Knox before a 2002 Jaguars preseason game; the proposal was broadcast on the stadium's JumboTron. The couple was married in February 2003 and have three children.

Garrard suffers from Crohn's disease and has appeared in television commercials regarding treating the illness. He has spoken to children at the Painted Turtle Camp, a camp for children with disorders about living with Crohn's disease.

Garrard has also appeared in a Zaxby's commercial. Garrard has also been the spokesman for 121 Financial Credit Union (formerly Florida Telco Credit Union) since 2007.

Garrard is a Christian. He spoke about his faith saying “ Having Jesus Christ as my Lord and Savior gives me so much peace. It’s still tough. It’s still hard sometimes, but you always can count on the Lord to be there for you, to never leave you, to never forsake you.”

See also
 Racial issues faced by black quarterbacks

References

External links

 
 Jacksonville Jaguars profile

1978 births
Living people
American football quarterbacks
East Carolina Pirates football players
Jacksonville Jaguars players
Miami Dolphins players
New York Jets players
Sportspeople from Durham, North Carolina
Sportspeople from Plainfield, New Jersey
Players of American football from New Jersey
Players of American football from North Carolina
African-American players of American football
African-American Christians
People with Crohn's disease
21st-century African-American sportspeople
20th-century African-American sportspeople
Ed Block Courage Award recipients